Crenicichla virgatula is a species of cichlid native to South America. It is found in the Amazon River basin and in the upper Branco River basin.

References

virgatula

Fish of the Amazon basin
Taxa named by Alex Ploeg
Fish described in 1991